Nicotine polacrilex is nicotine bound to an ion-exchange resin (polymethacrylic acid, such as Amberlite IRP64, Purolite C115HMR or Doshion P551). It is added to gums and hard lozenges used for nicotine replacement therapy in smoking cessation, particularly in the Nicorette range of products. The use of the polymer as a delivery system maximizes the amount of nicotine released and absorbed by the oral mucosa. 80 to 90 percent of the nicotine released from the gum is absorbed by the mouth. Side effects of the gum include bad taste, nausea, dyspepsia, and stomatitis.

See also
Nicotine gum

References

External links
 

Smoking cessation